Outlaws is a British television comedy-drama series, first broadcast on BBC Three on 1 October 2004, that ran for a total of twelve episodes across a single series. The series stars Phil Daniels as Bruce Dunbar, the head of a shifty legal firm dealing in criminal law, who trains new employee Theodore Gulliver (Ray Emmet Brown) in his fairly underhand methods. While Gulliver, fighting Dunbar's influence, tries to do his job as best he can, Dunbar has his own problems, from clients who ransack his offices, to dealing with his self-abusive teenage daughter. Produced by World Productions, the series was described as a mixture of black comedy and an accurate portrayal of the inner workings of the British legal system.

Alongside Daniels and Brown, the series also starred Georgia Mackenzie, Annabelle Apsion, and Rebekah Staton. Due to widespread critical acclaim and strong viewing figures, the series received a terrestrial broadcast, airing from 9 January 2005 on BBC Two. Tom Sutcliffe of The Independent commented that "Outlaws is brisk and funny and has a compelling frontman in Daniels. It is also informative about a world in which fine abstractions about justice and rehabilitation have crumbled into a set of cynical lash-ups. Panorama eat your heart out." Despite calls for a second series, Outlaws was not recommissioned by BBC executives and was subsequently axed.

The complete series was released on DVD on 28 March 2005.

Cast
 Phil Daniels as Bruce Dunbar; partner of Bagnall & Dunbar and senior defence solicitor
 Ray Emmet Brown as Theodore Gulliver; junior partner of Bagnall & Dunbar and junior defence solicitor
 Georgia Mackenzie as Sarah Beckenham; a CPS prosecutor known for her strong success record
 Annabelle Apsion as Elaine Ross; custody sergeant with the local police force
 Rebekah Staton as Janey Wallace; Bagnall & Dunbar office receptionist
 Craig Parkinson as Spinky Sutherland; a fellow CPS prosecutor who has a strikingly-low success record, often losing the simplest of cases on minor technicalities.
 Danny Cunningham as DC Danny Simons; corrupt police officer with the local police force who often makes use of the "TICs" to increase his clean-up rates.
 Connor McIntyre as Superintendent Gary Jackson; the divisional head of the local police force, who is also in a relationship with Dunbar's ex-wife, and is stepfather to Dunbar's only daughter.
 Craig Fitzpatrick as Connor Reilly; a vulnerable teenager suffering from a mental health disorder which results in him repeatedly burning down the care homes that he has been sent to live in.
 Harmage Singh Kalirai as Mr. Singh; a local defence solicitor whom Dunbar often unloads his "useless" cases on, purely on the basis of Singh's reputation of "being the worst solicitor in town".
 Ian Hanmore as Judge Roberts; a magistrate court judge.
 Mary Cunningham as Judge Grainger; a fellow magistrate court judge.
 Andrew Readman as Judge Jackson; a fellow magistrate court judge who often berates Dunbar for his use of over-excessive claims about his clients' "deprived childhood(s)" and "deceased mother(s)".
 Marvin Brown as Flymo ; a young gangster called Flymo because he always cuts the grass.

Episodes

References

External links

2004 British television series debuts
2004 British television series endings
2000s British crime television series
2000s British drama television series
2000s British legal television series
BBC television dramas
English-language television shows